Uwe Krüger (also spelled Krueger, born 11 October 1964) is a Swiss-German businessman and physicist. Krueger serves as Head of the Industrials, Business Services and Energy & Resources Investment Group, as well as the Head of the Portfolio Management Group at Temasek International in Singapore. He holds the position of Senior Managing Director at Temasek. Temasek is a leading globally diversified investment company headquartered in Singapore with a net portfolio of $275 billion. From June 2011 to July 2017 he was CEO of WS Atkins plc. The company was acquired by SNC-Lavalin and delisted from the London Stock Exchange effective July 2017.

Personal life
He lives in Switzerland. His wife, Dr. med. Daniela Greiner-Kruger, is a Medical Doctor (Dermatology). He became a Fellow of the Royal Academy of Engineering in 2017.

See also
 Association for Consultancy and Engineering

References

External links
 Building Future Rail at Atkins
 Times June 2011
 RAE Hinton Lecture
 RAE Awards Dinner 2013 (14m20)
 World Economic Forum digital cities
 McKinsey - Tackling infrastructure's digital frontier

1964 births
École Normale Supérieure alumni
Fellows of the Royal Academy of Engineering
German chief executives
21st-century Swiss businesspeople
Living people